Tom Insko is an American businessman and former academic administrator who served as the 12th president of Eastern Oregon University from 2015 to 2022.

Career 
Insko replaced outgoing President Bob Davies, who became President of Murray State University. Jay Kenton, a former administrator at the University of Oregon served as interim president before Insko took office.

In 2022 Insko left EOU to take a job as CEO of a wood products company, Collins, in Wilsonville, OR.

References 

American academic administrators
College of William & Mary alumni
Eastern Oregon University alumni
Eastern Oregon University faculty
Year of birth missing (living people)
Living people
Heads of universities and colleges in the United States